"Enemy" is a song by American pop rock band Imagine Dragons and American rapper JID. It was released through Interscope Records and Kidinakorner on October 28, 2021, from the soundtrack of the animated streaming television series Arcane.  The song was written by the artists alongside Justin Tranter and the producers Mattman & Robin. The song was also included on the band's fifth studio album Mercury – Act 1. The song became JID's first song to reach the top 5 in the US, and became the band's first song to reach the top 5 since the 2017 song "Thunder" and their 5th top 10 hit.

Background
"Enemy" was recorded for the animated Netflix series Arcane, which premiered on November 6, 2021. The inspiration behind the song was the video game League of Legends, with the band having previously recorded the song "Warriors" for the 2014 League of Legends World Championship. On Instagram, JID said "I wrote this verse a couple years ago but initially the opening lines were from a song I started with Mac [Miller], he told me it would fit better on this song and I’m glad he did."

Content
In a press release, the band's vocalist Dan Reynolds explained: "'Enemy' is about reconciling internal conflict in a world where it feels impossible to trust even yourself. In Arcane, two sisters' lives take them on different paths and leads to a division that threatens to tear an entire city apart. Like the series, the song is meant to be both personal and a critique of a society that seems intent on creating division."

Music video
An accompanying animated video was released on October 28, 2021, and produced by Riot Games and Fortiche Production. It features the League of Legends character Jinx in a story about "the parts of her childhood that led her to a life of crime" and several scenes of "the falling out between Jinx and her sister Vi".

Credits and personnel
Credits adapted from Tidal.

 Mattman & Robin – producer, composer, lyricist, associated performer, background vocalist, bass, brass band, drums, guitar, programming, synthesizer
 Justin Tranter – composer, lyricist, associated performer, background vocalist
 Imagine Dragons – composer, lyricist, engineer, studio personnel
 John Hanes – additional engineer, mix engineer, studio personnel
 JID – associated performer, vocals
 Dan Reynolds – associated performer, background vocals
 Ben Sedano – engineer, studio personnel
 Serban Ghenea – engineer, mixer, studio personnel
 Randy Merrill – mastering engineer, studio personnel

Charts

Weekly charts

Year-end charts

Certifications

Release history

References

2021 singles
2021 songs
Animated series theme songs
Imagine Dragons songs
JID songs
League of Legends
Number-one singles in Poland
Song recordings produced by Mattman & Robin
Songs written by Justin Tranter
Songs written by Ben McKee
Songs written by Daniel Platzman
Songs written by Dan Reynolds (musician)
Songs written by Wayne Sermon
Interscope Records singles
Kidinakorner singles
Rap rock songs
American pop rock songs